KOOQ (1410 AM) is a radio station broadcasting a classic hits format to the North Platte, Nebraska, United States, area. The station is owned by Eagle Communications, Inc.

On December 1, 2018, KOOQ dropped ESPN Radio and began stunting with Christmas music as "Reindeer Radio".

On December 27, 2018, after almost a month-long stunting with Christmas music, the station's format was changed to classic hits under the branding FM 98.1/1410 AM, focusing on music from the '70s, '80s and '90s.

Previous logo

References

External links

OOQ
Classic hits radio stations in the United States
Radio stations established in 1966
1966 establishments in Nebraska